Henry Garson (31 March 1912, New York City — 29 May 2003, Los Angeles) was an American scriptwriter, producer, and playwright.

His notable writing includes the film G.I. Blues, starring Elvis Presley, as well as two Jerry Lewis films. He also wrote, directed and produced episodes for TV shows such as All in the Family and I Love Lucy. His stage play In Any Language was performed on Broadway starring Walter Matthau.

References

External links

1912 births
2003 deaths
American film producers
20th-century screenwriters
20th-century American screenwriters